Vanbuskirk Gulf is a river located in Tompkins County, New York. It flows into Cayuga Inlet southeast of Newfield, New York.

Rivers of Tompkins County, New York
Rivers of New York (state)